Hydrobia acuta neglecta is a European subspecies of small brackish water snail with a gill and an operculum, an aquatic gastropod mollusk in the family Hydrobiidae.

Distribution

This species which has a distribution type: oceanic temperate occurs on the coasts of the North Sea, in countries and islands including:
 Iceland
 Denmark
 Sweden
 Great Britain
 Ireland
 France

Ecology
Hydrobia acuta neglecta occurs in coastal lagoons where incoming freshwater dilutes sea water. The preferred salinity range is 10-24 ‰.

Status
The status of this taxon is uncertain. Hydrobia neglecta is treated as a full species in Fauna Europaea, but in 1995 it had been suggested that H. neglecta is a synonym of the Mediterranean Hydrobia acuta (Draparnaud). Then a neglecta colony in northern France was shown to be acuta. In 2000 a molecular study concluded that north-west European populations were not specifically distinct from the Mediterranean Hydrobia acuta and designated them subspecies neglecta Muus.

References

External links 
 AnimalBase info and images at: 
 Hydrobia acuta neglecta Species account and photograph at Mollusc Ireland.

Conchological Society of Great Britain and Ireland Identification (Differences from the very similar species Ventrosia ventrosa (Montagu, 1803))

Hydrobiidae
Hydrobia
Gastropods described in 1963